or gantsubushi are a variety of implements and techniques that were used in feudal Japan by samurai police and other individuals to temporarily or permanently blind or disorient an opponent.

Description
One type of metsubushi was used by police for blowing powdered pepper or dust into the eyes of a suspect. It is described as being a lacquer or brass box with a wide mouthpiece for blowing on, and a hole or pipe on the other end for directing the powder into the eyes of the person being captured.
One type of metsubushi powder was made up of ashes, ground-up pepper, mud, flour, and dirt. For severe damage, it could also include fine-ground glass. It was kept in hollowed-out eggs (happō), bamboo tubes or other small containers.  When confronted by an attacker, a person would blow the metsubushi in the attacker's eyes, blinding them.

See also
 Mace
 Pepper spray

References

External links

Japanese martial arts terminology
Ninjutsu artefacts
Samurai police weapons